"Sin Contrato" is a song by Colombian singer Maluma taken from his second studio album Pretty Boy, Dirty Boy (2015). Maluma co-wrote the song with its producer Andrés Castro. It was released as the album's fourth single on 26 August 2016 through Sony Music Latin. The song peaked at number three in Colombia and at number seven on the US Hot Latin Songs chart.

The song featuring guest vocals from American girl group Fifth Harmony released in November 2015 in North America and Europe during their duet performance at 16th Annual Latin Grammy Awards and other versions featuring Puerto Rican singers Don Omar and Wisin released on the same month.

Music video
The music video for "Sin Contracto" premiered on 26 August 2016 on Maluma's Vevo account on YouTube. The music video was directed by Jessy Terrero and was filmed across various locations in the Dominican Republic. It features Yaritza Reyes who represented the Dominican Republic at Miss Universe 2013 in Russia and Miss World 2016 in the United States. The music video has over 990 million views on YouTube.

Track listing

Charts

Year-end charts

Certifications

See also
List of Billboard number-one Latin songs of 2017

References

External links

2016 singles
2016 songs
Don Omar songs
Fifth Harmony songs
Maluma songs
Wisin songs
Sony Music Latin singles
Sony Music Colombia singles
Spanish-language songs
Songs written by Maluma (singer)